Mangy Love is the eighth full-length album by American musician Cass McCombs. It was released on August 26, 2016.

Accolades

Track listing

Personnel 

 Cass McCombs – banjo, guitar, harmonium, piano, primary artist, producer, vocals
 Stuart Bogie – flute, horn, jaw harp
 Goat Carson – vocals
 Rachael Cassells  – photography
 Mark Chalecki – mastering
 Mike Gordon – guitar, vocals
 Kurt Heasley – vocals
 Trevor Hernandez – layout
 Albert Herter – illustrations
 Dan Horne – bass, guitar, mixing, producer, programming
 Jesse Lee – drums
 Blake Mills – guitar
 Jack Name – synthesizer
 Angel Olsen – vocals
 Sam Owens – mixing, producer
 Lee Pardini – keyboards, organ, piano, electric piano
 Ariel Rechtshaid – programming
 Brian Rosemeyer – engineer
 Joe Russo – drums, percussion
 Ryan Sawyer – congas
 Farmer Dave Scher – keyboards
 Rob Schnapf – mixing, producer
 Jon Shaw – bass
 Bongo Sidibe – percussion
 Aaron Sperske – drums
 Maxwell Wang – vocals
 Wilder Zoby – keyboards, synthesizer

Charts

References

2016 albums
Cass McCombs albums
Albums produced by Rob Schnapf
Anti- (record label) albums